The 1986–87 Drexel Dragons men's basketball team represented Drexel University  during the 1986–87 NCAA Division I men's basketball season. The Dragons, led by 10th year head coach Eddie Burke, played their home games at the Daskalakis Athletic Center and were members of the East Coast Conference (ECC).

The team finished the season 14–14, and finished in 5th place in the ECC in the regular season.

Roster

Schedule

|-
!colspan=9 style="background:#F8B800; color:#002663;"| Exhibition
|-

|-
!colspan=9 style="background:#F8B800; color:#002663;"| Regular season
|-

|-
!colspan=12 style="background:#FFC600; color:#07294D;"| ECC Tournament

Awards
Michael Anderson
ECC All-Conference First Team
Preseason ECC All-Conference First Team

Mike Joseph
ECC All-Rookie Team

Todd Lehmann
ECC All-Rookie Team

John Rankin
Preseason ECC All-Conference First Team

References

Drexel Dragons men's basketball seasons
Drexel
1986 in sports in Pennsylvania
1987 in sports in Pennsylvania